Boltwood is a surname. Notable people with the surname include:

Bertram Boltwood (1870–1927), American pioneer of radiochemistry
Paul Boltwood (1943–2017), Canadian amateur astronomer

See also
Beltwood House